Connaught (Jawi: کوناکت, Chinese: 康乐花园, Tamil:கொனாச்ட் ) is a residential township in Cheras, Kuala Lumpur, Malaysia. The Cheras Leisure Mall is situated near there, and most inhabitants of Connaught often go to Leisure Mall for shopping and meeting up with friends. The Connaught MRT station of the Kajang line is located near Cheras Sentral, formerly known as Plaza Phoenix.

Features

Connaught Night Market
Located along Jalan Cheras, Connaught Night Market is open only on Wednesdays every week from 5:00 pm to 1:00 am. The night market serves the needs of many of the ethnic Chinese residents here who come from all parts of Cheras, as well as UCSI University students. The night market is primarily known for the variety of Chinese food available, from stinky tofu to asam laksa. It also contributes to a massive traffic jam to the residents here, leading to some resentments among folks of Taman Connaught. Furthermore, as there is a lack of vacant parking spaces, the reckless parking behaviour on the highway adds to the risk of car accidents.

Controversial issues

TNB's high tension powerlines near Connaught
The 275kv and 132kv Tenaga Nasional Berhad, TNB's high tension powerline is built near Connaught, causing many residents of Taman Connaught to protest against it.

References

Suburbs in Kuala Lumpur